Scratches is a mystery adventure computer game by game developer Nucleosys. Scratches is the first commercial adventure game ever to be made in Argentina.

Plot
The game tells the story of the Blackwood estate on the outskirts of Rothbury, a small rural town in Northumberland, England in 1976.

Originally owned by James T. Blackwood in 1963, the house is passed to Christopher Milton after Mr. Blackwood is accused of murdering his wife. A couple of days later, Mr. Blackwood dies of a sudden heart attack though some in the town start rumors that he might have committed suicide. The police decide to close the case seeing there is no further evidence left. Shortly after acquiring the house, Milton inexplicably disappears in 1970 leaving no visible trace.

The player assumes the role of the house's next inhabitant, Michael Arthate, an author seeking seclusion to work on his next book. He moves in only to find that the house still echoes its horrible past quite literally as scratches are heard all around, particularly in the basement and fireplaces, and soon becomes more interested in researching the house's history than his writing.

In the end, it is revealed the scratches were being caused by Robin, the deformed son of James and Catherine, who was locked in the basement. Michael flees the house after this discovery, finishes his novel, and becomes a prolific novelist as a result from his encounter.

Original Ending
Originally, the player was supposed to use an amulet to kill Robin, turning him back into a human.  They would themselves die if they were not able to figure the puzzle out. Lead developer Agustin Cordes said the ending was "completely unfair in terms of design," and it was subsequently abandoned.

Last Visit
In the Director's Cut edition of the game, a sidequest called "The Last Visit" continues the narration from where Michael had fled. A reporter is sent to uncover the mysteries of Blackwood Manor before it will be destroyed. The place has become a scene of ruin; full of looting, vandalism, and graffiti. The reporter ultimately discovers Robin, who chases him until Milton appears at the manor to speak with Robin. Robin leaps onto Milton and presumably kills him as the reporter escapes. Blackwood Manor is then demolished and the reporter notes that the mystery of a mask found inside the home remains unsolved.

Cast
James Thomas Blackwood: An eccentric gentleman, Mr. Blackwood had always been a prominent figure in Rothbury, his hometown since his childhood, being one of the most successful construction engineers in the region.

Catherine Lydia Blackwood: James Blackwood's enigmatic wife, an English teacher at a local school in Rothbury.

Christopher Edward Milton: An intimate friend and longtime doctor to the Blackwood family.

Eva Mariani: Miss Mariani, an Italian immigrant and aspiring professional photographer, was the Blackwood family's maid for several years.

William Bailey: Mr Bailey, a now-retired police chief, was in charge of the investigation of the death of Catherine Blackwood in the early 1960s. He was convinced of Mr Blackwood's guilt, but was never able to convict him.

Michael Arthate: Michael is an up-and-coming writer. Sales of his acclaimed first novel, Vanishing Town (a reference to Dark Fall), left him with enough wealth to acquire an imposing Victorian mansion, a longtime dream of his.

Jerry P. Carter: An old friend of Michael, and a successful real estate agent.

Barbara Stiles: Michael hired Barbara as his assistant to aid him with fan mail and to contact magazines around the world, offering them his short stories.

Robin Blackwood: The son of James and Catherine Blackwood who was kept hidden from the public due to his deformities.

Gameplay
Scratches uses a first-person perspective to navigate around the house. Using only a mouse, the player can access various rooms and other places in order to solve the mystery of both Blackwood and Milton's disappearances. It features music and special sound effects by the now-defunct Cellar of Rats, which contribute to the fearsome ambience experienced at the mansion, crypt, greenhouse and church.

The game is heavily influenced by the H.P. Lovecraft mythos and several direct references to Lovecraft works make their appearances in Scratches. There are in-game references to the Necronomicon, De Vermis Mysteriis, Lovecraft's story "The Mountains of Madness," as well as one critic of Michael's book being called R'yleh. Michael states in the game he had just moved to Rothbury from Providence, Rhode Island-the hometown of Lovecraft.

Development 
Scratches was developed by a two-man team in Buenos Aires, Argentina. Agustin Cordes did the programming and design, while Alejandro Graziana did the art direction. They brought in ambient composer Cellar of Rats to handle the audio. The developers never intended to have a soundtrack, but after hearing Cellar of Rats work, they decided that it would add to the unsettling and cinematic atmosphere.

The developers opted to create their own engine called Scream (Simple Creation Engine for Adventure Makers), rather than licensing a pre-existing engine. The Scream engine utilised a combination of pre-rendered graphics and 3D, creating what the team referred to as “pseudo 3D”, an effect which was hard to create using existing adventure game engines.

The game was designed to be non-linear.

The games "horror" atmosphere has been compared to that of Resident Evil.

Artwork from the game started being released in 2004.

Scratches: Director's Cut saw changes analogous to those between  MYST and Realmyst.

Scratches went Gold on  February 21, 2006.

Release
Scratches was first released in North America on March 8, 2006 through game publisher Got Game Entertainment. However, Nucleosys had plans to release several international versions of the game worldwide.

A German version of the game has been available since March 2006 (published by Rondomedia), as has the Italian version Graffi Mortali (published by Power Up). A Greek version of the game is also available.

A Russian version of the game has been available since May 2006 (published by Russobit-M).

The Spanish version of the game (Rasguños) was announced but was never completed.

Nucleosys in 2007 released a "Director's Cut" version of Scratches, which includes an alternate ending and two more hours of gameplay. In addition to remastered sound, graphics and more. This version was announced on March 16, 2007. The title was part of Got Game Entertainment's mixed genre of games in 2007. On  October 21, 2010, Meridian4 announced that they had signed a digital publishing agreement with Nucleosys for this game. 

There were plans to create a Director's Commentary with a few additional features but as a result of Nucleosys' shutdown, it will not be released.

In 2012, Meridian4 released Scratches on Steam.

Versions for Linux and Mac OS X were planned, but were never released before the demise of the developer.

Critical reception

Globally, Scratches sold more than 150,000 units by March 2007. By 2012, sales had reached roughly 250,000 units. Upon release of the director's cut, Wired asserted "You probably didn't play PC game Scratches".

In March 2006, Scratches ranked in the top 10 of Amazon.com's Top Sellers in Computer and Video Games, as well as in popular game indexes such as GameRankings.com.

Scratches received mixed reviews but overall achieved an average to high score from most review sites. According to Gameguru the game " received decent reviews". Most notably GameSpot gave the game a 3.9 and IGN gave it a 7.7, emphasising the game's mixed reviews.

GamesRadar noted that the games uses a "brooding, silent atmosphere" to "slowly build up the tension and terror". Game Chrinocle offered a positive review on the horror aspects of the game. IGN seerted that it was "average" and "decent-to-good".

Legacy 
After Nucleosys went out of business, Agustín Cordes would go on to found Senscape, who are currently developing the horror game Asylum after a successful Kickstarter crowdfunding campaign.

Scratches is the first commercially released adventure game ever developed in Argentina.

See also 
Asylum (upcoming video game)
List of horror video games

References

External links

Scratches at Metacritic
Main page
Video interview with developer (Spanish)

2006 video games
Windows games
Windows-only games
Cancelled Linux games
Cancelled macOS games
Adventure games
First-person adventure games
2000s horror video games
Point-and-click adventure games
Video games developed in Argentina
Video games set in Northumberland
Russobit-M games
Single-player video games
Got Game Entertainment games
Meridian4 games